BKM Lučenec is a Slovakian basketball club based in Lučenec. The team plays in the Slovak Basketball League (SBL). The club has won the national championship twice, in 2004 and 2006.

Honours
Slovak League
Winners (2): 2003–04, 2005–06
Slovak Cup
Winners (2): 2004, 2006, 2022

References

External links
Official website

 

Basketball teams in Slovakia
Sport in Banská Bystrica Region